Wilber Brotherton Huston (October 2, 1912 – May 25, 2006) was an American scientist and NASA mission director.  He was the Deputy Project Manager of the Nimbus program and served as mission director for seven satellite launches.  At the age of sixteen he had won the first Edison Scholarship Contest.

Biography
Huston was born in Detroit, Michigan, the first child of the Reverend S. Arthur Huston, curate at St. Paul's Cathedral, and the former Dorothea J. Brotherton.  His parents named him for Wilber Brotherton, his maternal grandfather, who was the manager of the Detroit operations of the Jerome B. Rice Seed Company.  The Wilber spelling, instead of Wilbur, derived from admiration for William Wilberforce, the English abolitionist.  His maternal grandmother was Belle Brotherton, a leader in the women's suffrage movement.

Between 1913 and 1925 Huston, as a minister's son, lived in Cheyenne, Wyoming, Baltimore, Maryland, and San Antonio, Texas.  In 1925, when his father was consecrated as Bishop of the Episcopal Diocese of Olympia, his family settled in Seattle, Washington, and Huston enrolled at Lakeside School from which he graduated in 1929.

Early in 1929 Thomas Edison called a news conference to announce a national contest with the winner to receive an all-expenses-paid scholarship to the university of his choice.  The governor of each state and the commissioners of the District of Columbia were to select a high school senior to represent their jurisdiction that August at Edison Laboratories in West Orange, New Jersey.  Besides Edison, the judges would be Henry Ford, Harvey Firestone, George Eastman, Abrahamn De Mallie, Samuel Stratton, Lewis Perry (the principal of Phillips Exeter Academy), and Charles Lindbergh.

Huston's maternal grandfather wrote to his father saying that the contest would be an excellent opportunity.  Huston submitted a letter of application, his high school transcript, and three letters of recommendation.  In due course Governor Roland H. Hartley announced that he had selected Huston and four others to travel to the state capital at their own expense for further screening.  In Olympia the candidates took a written examination and submitted to interviews.  After a caucus the examiners recommended that Huston represent Washington.

In August 1929 Huston was in West Orange, New Jersey, to compete for the Edison scholarship.  He finished in a five-way tie for first place; the tie was broken by interviews with the judges.

Huston entered Massachusetts Institute of Technology in the fall of 1929 and graduated in June 1933
with an S.B. degree in physics.  
Following graduation he accepted a position at Calibron, a small research company founded by Theodore Edison, the inventor's youngest son.

In the late 1930s Huston became interested in the Moral Re-Armament movement and left Calibron to accept a full-time position under Frank Buchman.

As a volunteer religious worker Huston was deferred from the draft until 1943.  From that year until late 1944 he served in the United States Army Air Forces training bomber crews in celestial navigation before they went overseas.

In November 1944 the Army transferred Huston to the Civilian Reserve Corps at the Langley Research Center in Hampton, Virginia, where he worked as an aeronautical research scientist for the National Advisory Committee for Aeronautics.  Following his discharge he accepted a civil service position with NACA at Langley.

On July 29, 1958, NACA became reconstituted as the National Aeronautics and Space Administration with Project Mercury initially at Langley.  Huston provided training for the Mercury astronauts in celestial navigation.

In 1961 Huston accepted an invitation to transfer to the newly opened Goddard Space Flight Center to work on the Nimbus program.  As deputy project manager he served as Mission Director for the successful launches of Nimbus 1, launched August 28,
1964, Nimbus 2 on May 15, 1966, Nimbus 3 on May 14, 1969, Nimbus 4 on April 8, 1970, Landsat 1 on 
July 23, 1972, and Nimbus 5 on December 11, 1972.  A Nimbus satellite launched in 1968 failed to reach orbit.

Huston retired from NASA in 1975 and immediately took a position with OAO Corporation, later part of 
Lockheed Martin Information Technology.  In 1983 he retired from OAO and became self-employed until 
1988 when he retired for a third and final time.

On September 21, 1946, Huston had married Dorothy E. Beadle (1922 – 1996), a mathematician 
at Langley Research Center.  They were the parents of six children, five of whom survived them.

Huston died in Fountain Hills, Arizona, and is buried at 
Holy Trinity Episcopal Church 
in Bowie, Maryland.

References

NASA people
American aerospace engineers
MIT Department of Physics alumni
Scientists from Detroit
1912 births
2006 deaths
United States Army Air Forces soldiers
United States Army personnel of World War II
Lakeside School alumni
20th-century American engineers